Gianluca Maggiore (born 21 February 1985) is an Italian former racing cyclist.

Major results
2008
 7th Coppa Caivano
2009
 3rd Coppa Colli Briantei Internazionale
2012
 10th Giro del Veneto

References

1985 births
Living people
Italian male cyclists
Sportspeople from Naples
Cyclists from Campania